Bani Jasmar is a sub-district located in Maswar District, 'Amran Governorate, Yemen. Bani Jasmar had a population of 2299  according to the 2004 census.

References 

Sub-districts in Maswar District